The 1964–65 African Cup of Champions Clubs, known as Kwame Nkrumah Cup was the first edition of the annual international club football competition held in the CAF region (Africa), the African Cup of Champions Clubs. It determined that year's club champion of association football in Africa.

The tournament was played by 14 teams. They were split in 3 groups, with each group winner qualifying to the final tournament held in Ghana. Oryx Douala from Cameroon won the final, and became the first CAF club champion.

Preliminary round
Fourteen teams entered the preliminary round, divided over three zones.

Real Republicans of Ghana qualified as the host of the final tournament.

North-Eastern Zone

First round

|}

Second round

|}
Cotton Factory Club qualified.

Western Zone

First round

|}

Stade Malien won 5–1 on aggregate.

Sily CK won 6–4 on aggregate.

ASEC Mimosas won after Étoile Filante withdrew.

AS Porto-Novo won after Port Harcourt FC withdrew.

Second round

|}

As the aggregate finished 4–4, a  replay was required.

Stade Malien qualified.

ASEC Mimosas won 5–3 on aggregate.

Third round

|}

Stade Malien won 9–7 on aggregate and qualified.

Central-South-Western Zone

|}

Oryx Douala won 5–4 on aggregate and qualified.

Final tournament
The final tournament was held in Accra and Kumasi, Ghana.

Semi-finals

Bronze-medal match

Final

Champion

Top scorers
The top scorers from the 1964–65 African Cup of Champions Clubs are as follows:

External links
Coupe de la CAF : Stade Malien 44 ans après...
RSSSF summary of results at Rec.Sport.Soccer Statistics Foundation

1964 in African football
1965 in African football
African Cup of Champions Clubs